All India Institute of Medical Sciences, Jodhpur (AIIMS Jodhpur; IAST: Akhil Bharatiya Aayurvigyan Sansthan Jodhpur) is a medical institute and medical research public university based in Jodhpur, India. It is an Institute of National Importance. Like five other All India Institutes of Medical Sciences (AIIMS), it was established in 2012 and operates autonomously under the Ministry of Health and Family Welfare. The institute is mandated to create excellence in medical education, research and patient care and establish models for affordable and quality healthcare through innovations. AIIMS Jodhpur is also governed under AIIMS Act, 1956.

Establishment
The All-India Institute of Medical Sciences (Amendment) Bill, 2012, was introduced in the Lok Sabha on 27 August 2012. This bill replaced an Ordinance which allowed the six AIIMS institutes to become operational from September 2012. Lok Sabha passed the AIIMS (Amendment) Bill, 2012 on 30 August 2012. Prior to that, the six new AIIMS were registered under the Indian Societies Registration Act and the Bill allowed them to become autonomous bodies corporated on the lines of the existing AIIMS Delhi in Delhi. AIIMS (Amendment) Bill, 2012 was introduced in Rajya Sabha on 3 September 2012. Rajya Sabha passed the AIIMS (Amendment) Bill, 2012 on 4 September 2012, and the six AIIMS started operating in September 2012. All AIIMS are public teaching hospitals and are mandated with training in various courses (MBBS, MD/MS, DM/MCH, BSc Honours in Nursing, MSc, MPH, PhD). AIIMS Jodhpur is also delivering Joint Program in MedTech in collaboration with Indian Institute of Technology (IIT) Jodhpur.

Location

AIIMS Jodhpur(Rajasthan) is situated at outskirts of city of Industrial Area Basni, Jodhpur. On 31 January 2004, then Finance Minister Jaswant Singh (Jasol) had laid the foundation stone of AIIMS Jodhpur. Sushma Swaraj, then Health Minister, and Rajnath Singh, then Agriculture Minister, were also present on the occasion. Jodhpur is located in the geographical center of Rajasthan and is also the entry point for Thar Desert in Western India.

Academics

From 2013 onwards AIIMS started admitting 100 MBBS and 60 BSc Nursing(Hons.) students. Outdoor patient(OPD) services began at the AIIMS Jodhpur from 27 July 2013. AIIMS has started MD courses in Anatomy, Biochemistry, Physiology and Community Medicine and Family Medicine departments from 2016. AIIMS Jodhpur started Postgraduate courses in 20 departments from 2017 with 56 seats. Admissions to the post graduate courses is done through a common entrance exam known as Institute of National Importance-Common Entrance Test (INI-CET) along with PGI, Chandigarh, JIPMER Puduchery, NIMHANS Bangalore and SCTIMS, Trivandrum. AIIMS Jodhpur admits 194 PG students every year. The institute also admits students in superspeciality (DM/MCH) program through INI-SS Exams conducted by AIIMS Delhi. AIIMS Jodhpur uses innovations in Medical Education and patient care. AIIMS Jodhpur Model of Medical Education utilizes Unconventional Learning Experiences (UNCLE) for delivering Competency Based Medical Education in its special sessions on Saturdays. The President of India, Shri Ram Nath Kovind graced and addressed the students during 2nd Convocation of the institute on 7 December 2019 and lauded the efforts of AIIMS Jodhpur in collaborating with IIT Jodhpur for medical innovation course

AIIMS Jodhpur Model of Medical Education 
AIIMS Jodhpur has established a unique model for medical education. The model introduced since beginning of the Institute in 2012, centered around involving both faculty facilitators as well as students. One day in a week (Saturdays) is devoted for implementing innovative ideas or pedagogical methods with students as primary stakeholders. Department are joined by mutidisciplines for theme based integrated teaching sessions. This makes the learning of a subject engaging and contextual to patient care right from beginning. The model also incorporates sessions with UNCoventional Learning Experiences (UNCLE) where innovative methods like Flipped Classroom, teaching professionalism, using Clickers (Audience Response System) for involving even the quiet students, using 'Reverse Telelmedicine' for taking patients from hospital or ICUs to classroom or hostel.

National Ranking

1. National Institutional Ranking Framework 

All India Institute of Medical Sciences, Jodhpur (IR-D-U-0689) ranked 16th in National Institutional Ranking Framework (NIRF) of Ministry of Education for Medical category in 2022. Thus, it is the 2nd best AIIMS, after AIIMS, new Delhi.

2. India Today Ranking, 2021 
AIIMS Jodhpur ranked 23 by the India Today magazine for year 2021.

Research and Publication 
Institute mandate is to build evidences through clinical, laboratory, community and translational research. Medical students are encouraged to get involved in research under guidance of faculty members. Faculty engagement in research is visible through Scopus. The Scopus affiliation ID for AIIMS Jodhpur: 60108918

AIIMS Hospital

Overview 
AIIMS Jodhpur hospital has five floor Out-patient department (OPD) Block housing all broad and super-speciality except Physical Medicine & Rehabilitation (PMR) department which is housed separately on ground-floor accessible to all patients with disability. OPD is disabled friendly with 6 elevators (Lifts) and ramp. Emergency & Trauma block is accessible through Gate 3 with ambulance bay. The block has ground, first and second floors while emergency triage is located at ground-floor. Emergency OT's are located at ground-floor and 2nd floor. Trauma Intensive Care is located on 2nd floor. The emergency block also houses a Dialysis Unit on the first floor with 11 machines. The diagnostic block is located backside of the Emergency block on ground and first floor. Equipments are available in Radiology department which includes two CT scan, 1 MRI, Digital Subtraction Angiography (DSA) suite for all interventional procedures along with Mammography, sonography and digital X-rays. The Nuclear Medicine department is having a PET-CT scan. Pathology department is having facilities for Immunohistochemistry (IHC) and Molecular pathology supported by Department of Health Research -"DHR-ICMR Advance Medical Oncology Diagnostic Services (DIAMONDS)"  The institute has 30 modular Operation Theaters, 30 bedded Intensive Care Unit (ICU), 16 bedded Pediatric Intensive Care Unit (PICU) and 18 bedded Neonatal Intensive Care Unit (NICU). Robotic surgeries are being carried out for difficult to reach areas like Urology, gynecology, Pediatric and cancer surgeries. More than 500 robotic surgeries have been performed by December 2021. Overall, the institute is able to provide high class care for difficult, high risk and cases with dilemma.

Centers of Excellence

1. Center of Excellence for Tribal Health, AIIMS Jodhpur 
Ministry of Tribal Affairs (MoTA) Government of India has chosen AIIMS Jodhpur as one of their Center of Excellence (CoE) for Tribal Health. The objectives were to study the practices of Tribal healers, piloting of Telemedicine and understanding common diseases for which awareness can be created.

2. Center of Excellence in Oncology under India-Sweden Innovation Center 
As part of India-Sweden Innovation center, a tripartite agreement between AIIMS Jodhpur, AIIMS Delhi and Business Sweden, a Live CoE, the first project on Comprehensive Cancer Patient Support Service was established in AIIMS Jodhpur campus to deliver treatment to cancer patients  The center was launched along with felicitation of 10 start-ups selected for the 2nd edition of India-Sweden innovation challenge at Dubai Expo 2020 on 31 January 2022.

Projects 
GenomeIndia: Cataloguing the Genetic Variation in Indians

AIIMS Jodhpur is part of a project under Department of Biotechnology (DBT), Government of India in a flagship project, a pan-India initiative focused on Whole Genome Sequencing of representative populations across India. The goal of the initiative is to carry out whole genome sequencing and subsequent data analysis of 10,000 individuals representing the country's diverse population. Institute is assigned to engage various community through its Community Engagement and Involvement initiative, obtain consent, create awareness, obtain clinical and biochemical phenotype and request their samples for high level whole exome sequencing and biobanking.

Student activities 
Talents of the students is not only seen in academics but also in extracurricular activities. The following activities are carried out regularly by the students:

ABHIVYAKTI: The AIIMSJ LITERARY CLUB - It was started in year 2015 by students of AIIMS Jodhpur including Ajey Singh Rathore, Deeksha Patkar, Vaishali Ranganathan, Ishant Kumar Sahu, Monish Gupta, Harkirat Singh, Udita Patni, Akanksha Saini and many others. The club is involved in enhancing the interest of students in literary activities and to connect them with the Literature, despite of busy schedules. The club organises literary activities throughout the year and holds regular club meetings. It also organises an open mic event, Alfaaz and Manthan, on the day of Hindi Diwas. The club also publishes annual college magazine, Rohida, as the representation in the Editorial Board. The junior members of club makes the annual yearbook for the passing out batch of MBBS from AIIMS Jodhpur every year.

Aura 
The Best Medfest of India organized by medical students at AIIMS Jodhpur. The multi-cultural activity with participants from academic institutions across the country show their talents in sports, arts, literary and informal events.Usually is conducted in March every year.

TEJAS 
The Intracollege Sports Event , Where in the teams of different batches compete against each other in variety of sports events ranging from Cricket, Volleyball, Basketball,  Athletics, Handball, Tennis, Badminton, Table Tennis ,  Chess and other events.

From 2020, there are 125 seats for MBBS in AIIMS Jodhpur.

Annual Reports of the Institute

Annual Report 2016-17 
The annual report highlighted work done by the faculty, residents, students and staff of the institute during 2016–17. Notable among them was that the institute was  awarded the "Certificate of Commendation" and a sum of Rupees Fifty Lacs by the Ministry of Health & Family Welfare, Government of India (GoI) under its "Kayakalp Program".  The program recognize the efforts made towards cleanliness and hygiene and creating awareness to encourage the same among public for better health. The institute also continued with its paperless system, aligned with the Government "Digital India" initiative.

Annual Report 2015-16 
The year witnessed progress in multiple fronts. The notable event was visiting by Hon'ble Health Minister Shri J P Nadda on 6 June 2015.

The Health Minister, who was also President of the Institute Body, inaugurated Laboratory Complex, Blood Bank, Physical Medicine & Rehabilitation Block and Computerized Patient Management System. He also visited other facilities.

Annual Report 2014-15 
The OPD and IPD  services  at  AIIMs,  Jodhpur  grew  during  the  year  2014–15.  The  Institute  began  its OT  complex  where  all  types  of  surgeries  have  been  performed.  More  than  86,000  patients  visited  the  OPD  and  nearly  2500  patients  were  admitted  in  the  IPD during  the  year.

See also
 All India Institute of Medical Sciences
 Education in India
 List of medical colleges in India

References

Medical colleges in Jodhpur
Medical colleges in Rajasthan
Jodhpur
Colleges in Jodhpur
Educational institutions established in 2012
2012 establishments in Rajasthan